AJP or ajp may refer to:

 American Journal of Philology, published by Johns Hopkins University Press
 American Journal of Psychiatry, published by the American Psychiatric Association
 American Journal of Psychology, published by the University of Illinois Press
 American Journal of Physics, published by the American Association of Physics Teachers and the American Institute of Physics
 American Journal of Physiology, published by the American Physiological Society
 Asian Jake Paul, single by American Youtuber IDubbbz
 Australasian Journal of Philosophy, published by the Australasian Association of Philosophy
 AJP Motos, a Portuguese motorcycle brand
 Animal Justice Party, a political party in Australia focusing on animal rights
 Apache JServ Protocol, protocol for computer servers
 All Japan Pro Wrestling, Japanese professional wrestling promotion
 South Levantine Arabic (deprecated ISO 639-3 code)
 AJP6 and AJP8, TVR engines